Laevinus Torrentius, born  Lieven van der Beke (1525–1595), was the second bishop of Antwerp.

Career 
He studied philosophy and law at Leuven University and then at the University of Bologna. For five years he lived in Rome. He was appointed Canon of Liege cathedral, and became there vicar general.

He was appointed bishop of Antwerp in 1576 but could not be installed in his see until 1587. He died in 1595, after being nominated to the see of Mechelen but before being appointed.

After his death, he left his precious library, worth an estimated 30.000 gulden, to the Jesuits of Louvain. He was buried inside the cathedral.

References

1525 births
1595 deaths
16th-century Roman Catholic bishops in the Holy Roman Empire
Bishops of Antwerp
Clergy from Ghent